Dival Forele Malonga Dzalamou (born April 18, 1995) is a boxer from the Republic of the Congo. He competed at the 2016 Summer Olympics in the men's light welterweight event, in which he was eliminated in the first round by Fazliddin Gaibnazarov.

References

1995 births
Living people
Republic of the Congo male boxers
Olympic boxers of the Republic of the Congo
Boxers at the 2016 Summer Olympics
Light-welterweight boxers